Brian Foley may refer to:

 Brian Foley (bishop) (1910–1999), English Roman Catholic bishop of Lancaster
 Brian Foley (Coronation Street), Fictional character
 Brian Foley (footballer) (1933–1998), Australian rules footballer
 Brian Foley (hymnist) (1919–2000), Roman Catholic priest and hymnist
 Brian Foley (racing driver) (born 1932)
 Brian X. Foley (born 1957), American politician in the New York State Senate
 Brian Foley, American healthcare magnate and husband of Lisa Wilson-Foley